Titauli is a village in Salarpur block, Budaun district, Uttar Pradesh, India. The village is administrated by Gram panchayat. Its village code is 128265. According to 2011 Census of India, the total population of the village is 1,749, out of 955 are males and 794 are females.

References

Villages in Budaun district